Maryia Mamashuk (Łacinka: Maryja Rusłanaŭna Mamašuk; born 31 August 1992) is a Belarusian wrestler. Competing in the 63 kg division she won silver medals at the 2014 European Championships and 2016 Olympics. In 2016 she also won the European title in the 69 kg category.

In 2021, she lost her bronze medal match in the women's 65 kg event at the World Wrestling Championships held in Oslo, Norway.

References

External links 

 

1992 births
Living people
Belarusian female sport wrestlers
Wrestlers at the 2016 Summer Olympics
Olympic wrestlers of Belarus
Sportspeople from Gomel
Olympic silver medalists for Belarus
Olympic medalists in wrestling
Medalists at the 2016 Summer Olympics
Universiade medalists in wrestling
Universiade bronze medalists for Belarus
Wrestlers at the 2015 European Games
European Games medalists in wrestling
European Games bronze medalists for Belarus
Wrestlers at the 2019 European Games
European Wrestling Championships medalists
Medalists at the 2013 Summer Universiade
21st-century Belarusian women